Oudious Lee, Jr. (born June 14, 1956) is a former American football nose tackle who played one season with the St. Louis Cardinals of the National Football League (NFL). He played college football at the University of Nebraska–Lincoln and attended Omaha South High School in Omaha, Nebraska. He was also a member of the Boston/New Orleans Breakers and Denver Gold of the United States Football League (USFL).

Professional career
Lee played in one game for the NFL's St. Louis Cardinals during the 1980 season. He played for the Boston/New Orleans Breakers of the USFL from 1983 to 1984. He played for the USFL's Denver Gold in 1984.

References

External links
Just Sports Stats

Living people
1956 births
Players of American football from Nebraska
American football defensive tackles
African-American players of American football
Nebraska Cornhuskers football players
Boston/New Orleans/Portland Breakers players
St. Louis Cardinals (football) players
Denver Gold players
Sportspeople from Omaha, Nebraska
21st-century African-American people
20th-century African-American sportspeople